Kazi Syed Karimuddin MA, LLB (19 July 1899, in Yavatmal District, Maharashtra – 14 November 1977) was a member of the Constituent Assembly of India that framed the Indian Constitution.

The son of Kazi Syed Naseeruddin and Diyanat Begum R/O Darwha Dist.Yavatmal Maharashtra, he studied at the Aligarh Muslim University founded by Sir Syed Ahmed Khan. A criminal lawyer par excellence, he was a prominent member of the Congress party. His younger brother, Kazi Syed Gyasuddin, was  a famous criminal lawyer (also LLB from Aligarh) and a Congress MLA from Akola and held several ministerial positions in Maharashtra Assembly (1951–62).

As well as participating in the Constituent Assembly that framed the constitution for independent India from 1947 to 1950, he was a member of the Madhya Pradesh Legislative Assembly until 1952 (at that time Madhya Pradesh was known as the Central Province). Following that he was a member of the Rajya Sabha (the upper house of the Indian Parliament) from 1954 to 1958.
He moved an amendment on the lines of American Constitution to make right to privacy a fundamental right but Dr. B.R. Ambedkar gave it only reserved support.

He had three sons and five daughters. His sons-in-law include Syed Mukassir Shah, former chairman of the Andhra Pradesh Legislative Council and Justice M.M. Qazi, former chairman of the Maharashtra Administrative Council and retired High Court judge.

References

External links
asp?alphabet=K Members of Parliament
Who's Who

Aligarh Muslim University alumni
Members of the Constituent Assembly of India
People from Yavatmal district
1899 births
1977 deaths
Madhya Pradesh MLAs 1947–1952
Rajya Sabha members from Madhya Pradesh
Faculty of Law, Aligarh Muslim University alumni